Barbara Harrison Wescott (October 27, 1904 – April 8, 1977) was an American publisher and heiress.

She was the second daughter of Francis Burton Harrison and his first wife Mary Crocker, an heiress from San Francisco. Her maternal grandfather was Charles Crocker, a self-made multi-millionaire who founded the Central Pacific Railroad and, with three other men, took over the Southern Pacific Railroad and built the transcontinental railroad. Harrison's mother was killed in a car accident in 1905 at age 23 when Barbara was barely a year old.  According to a 1914 article in The Washington Post, her inheritance from her mother was then worth some $2 million; adjusted for inflation, this would equal $43 million in 2014 dollars.

While living in France, she worked closely with other American expatriates in the literary world. She and Monroe Wheeler established Harrison of Paris, a press publishing limited-edition literary paperbacks. From 1930 to 1934, Harrison of Paris published thirteen titles, including two new works by Glenway Wescott, Wheeler's longtime companion. In 1934, shortly before Barbara Harrison married Glenway's brother Lloyd Wescott, the press relocated to New York, where it published a final title, Katherine Anne Porter's Hacienda. She continued her patronage of the arts throughout her life and was a noted collector of artwork. 

She died in 1977.

References

1904 births
1977 deaths
American paperback book publishers (people)
20th-century American businesspeople
Crocker family